Transcription factor II F (TFIIF) is one of several general transcription factors that make up the RNA polymerase II preinitiation complex.

TFIIF binds to RNA polymerase II when the enzyme is already unbound to any other transcription factor, thus preventing it from contacting DNA outside the promoter. Furthermore, TFIIF stabilizes the RNA polymerase II while it's contacting TBP and TFIIB.

See also 
 TFIIA
 TFIIB
 TFIID
 TFIIE
 TFIIH

References

External links 
 

Molecular genetics
Proteins
Gene expression
Transcription factors